Daniel Weiss (born 18 July 1968) is a German former competitive figure skater who competed in men's singles. He is the 1989 Skate Canada International bronze medalist, the 1991 Nations Cup bronze medalist, and a two-time German national champion, winning the title in 1990 and 1991. He finished fifth at the 1989 European Championships and competed at three World Championships. After retiring from competition in 1992, Weiss skated professionally and works as a television commentator. He also organizes ice shows.

Competitive highlights

References

External links 
 Spotlight Productions: Daniel Weiss

Navigation

1968 births
German male single skaters
Figure skating commentators
Living people
Sportspeople from Ingolstadt